"Automatic" is the second song released by Pop Idol contestant Sarah Whatmore. The song was originally due to be included on her debut album, however the album was cancelled.

The single was released on 10 February 2003 in the United Kingdom. It peaked at number 11 in the UK Singles Chart in February 2003. It is also included on the compilation CD Hits 55.

Track listings and formats
UK CD single (maxi)
"Automatic" (Original Radio Version)  
"When I Lost You" (Robbie Rivera Vocal Mix)  
"Automatic" (Stella Browne Vocal Mix)  
"Automatic" (music video)

Charts

Release history

References

2002 songs
2003 singles
Sarah Whatmore songs
Songs written by Richard Stannard (songwriter)
Song recordings produced by Richard Stannard (songwriter)
19 Recordings singles
RCA Records singles